Ranau may refer to:

 Ranau, Sabah, Malaysia
 Lake Ranau, Indonesia